Business in Sport and Leisure (BISL) is a British umbrella organization comprising a number of major sport and leisure companies.

References

Business organisations based in the United Kingdom